The filmography of Bulgarian-born Slovak actress Božidara Turzonovová chronicles her work through the artist's fifty years as a film, television and stage actress. She entered film industry in 1961, and made her official cinematic debut in the Vladislav Pavlovič's production of Most na tú stranu. Overall, she appeared in one-hundred-seventy-one titles to date, of which thirty-five are feature, and one-hundred-thirty-seven television films or series. While on stage, Turzonovová was cast in one-hundred-eight plays or musicals, eight of which have been also televised.

Filmography

Film

Television

TV movies

TV series

Stage

Slovak National Theater

Other appearances

See also
 List of awards and nominations received by Božidara Turzonovová

Footnotes

References
General

Specific

External links 

 
 Božidara Turzonovová filmography at FDb
 Božidara Turzonovová filmography at FilmováMísta.cz
 
 Božidara Turzonovová filmography at KinoBox
 
 Božidara Turzonovová filmography at TCMd

Actress filmographies